State Highway 31 ( RJ SH 31) is a State Highway in Rajasthan state of India that connects Jalore in Jalore district of Rajasthan with Raniwara in same district. The total length of RJ SH 31 is 107 km. 

Other cities and towns on this highway are: Bagra, Akoli, Mandoli, Ramseen and Bhinmal.

See also
 List of State Highways in Rajasthan

References
 State Highway

Jalore district
State Highways in Rajasthan